The East Dart River is one of the two main tributaries of the River Dart in Devon, England.

Its source is to the west of Whitehorse Hill and slightly south of Cranmere Pool on Dartmoor. It flows south and then south-west for around 9 km to reach the village of Postbridge where it is spanned by a well-known clapper bridge.

Just above Postbridge the river drops around 2 metres in a short distance and the point is referred to as "Waterfall".
	

It continues south past Bellever to Dartmeet where it joins the West Dart.

References

Dart
Dart
River Dart
1EastDart